Salomon Brothers, Inc., was an American multinational bulge bracket investment bank headquartered in New York. It was one of the five largest investment banking enterprises in the United States and the most profitable firm on Wall Street during the 1980s and 1990s. Its CEO and chairman at that time, John Gutfreund, was nicknamed "the King of Wall Street".

Salomon Brothers served many of the largest corporations in America. At one time, it was the leading underwriter of corporate bonds and the largest dealer of Treasury Securities in the United States. It was also one of the top firms in futures and options (known as "derivatives") and in securitization in a range of asset classes including commercial real estate securities.

The bank was famed for its "cutthroat corporate culture that rewarded risk-taking with massive bonuses, punishing poor results with a swift boot." In Michael Lewis' 1989 book Liar's Poker, the insider descriptions of life at Salomon gave way to the popular view of banking in the 1980s and '90s as a money-focused and work-intense environment.

In February 2022, it was announced that the Salomon Brothers brand will be revived by a group of former employees and execs and operate as full-service investment bank again.

History

Founding
Founded in 1910 by Arthur, Herbert, and Percy Salomon and a clerk, Ben Levy. The founding Salomon Brothers are descendants of Haym Salomon, primary financier of the American Revolutionary War, Consul to France, and childhood friend to Robert Morris, Founding Father and Superintendent of Finance of the United States. The company remained a partnership until the early 1980s. William Salomon, the son of Percy Salomon, became a managing partner and the head of the company in 1963.

In 1967, Salomon Brothers sponsored Muriel Siebert, the first woman to obtain a trading license on the floor of the New York Stock Exchange.

Top ranking and public financing: 1970-1979 
In 1975, Salomon Brothers was formally recognized by other top investment banks as a "bulge bracket" firm, meaning it was one of the leaders in investment banking. In 1979, Salomon Brothers scored a major coup when IBM insisted that Morgan Stanley accept Salomon Brothers as co-manager on a $1-billion debt issue for a new generation of IBM computers. Morgan Stanley demanded sole management, but IBM affirmed Salomon Brothers’ role as co-manager. In response, Morgan Stanley refused to act as co-manager, and Salomon Brothers and Merrill Lynch were awarded top billing as a result.

In 1975, Salomon Brothers also aided the state’s efforts to save New York City from bankruptcy. When the Municipal Action Committee (MAC) was established and bonds were created in its name, Salomon Brothers and Morgan Guaranty Trust organized syndicates for the $1 billion bond sale. Both of the organizations were able to place the bonds successfully.

In 1978, John Gutfreund became a managing partner, and succeeded William Salomon as head of the company.

Salomon Brothers during the 1980s
In 1981, it was acquired by the commodity trading firm Phibro Corporation and became Salomon Inc. It was the reverse merger that enabled Gutfreund to take the company public. Gutfreund became the CEO of the company following the reverse merger.

During the 1980s, Salomon was noted for its innovation in the bond market, selling the first mortgage-backed security, a hitherto obscure species of financial instrument created by Ginnie Mae. Shortly thereafter, Salomon purchased home mortgages from thrifts throughout the United States and packaged them into mortgage-backed securities, which it sold to local and international investors. Later, it moved away from traditional investment banking (helping companies raise funds in the capital market and negotiating mergers and acquisitions) to almost exclusively proprietary trading (the buying and selling of stocks, bonds, options, etc. for the profit of the company itself). Salomon had expertise in fixed income securities and trading based on daily swings in the bond market.

The firm competed for the leveraged buyout of RJR Nabisco and the leveraged buyout of Revco stores (which ended in failure).

In 1987, a New York Times report identified Salomon Brothers as in the top tier of firms along with Merrill Lynch, Morgan Stanley and Goldman Sachs.

Salomon Brothers' success in the 1980s is documented in Michael Lewis' 1989 book, Liar's Poker. Lewis went through Salomon's training program and then became a bond salesman at Salomon Brothers in London. Lewis presented an insider description of life at Salomon Brothers, and his book became a seminal work in terms of understanding the corporate culture at Salomon Brothers in the 1980s.

Lewis describing the trading floor at Salomon:

1990s treasury bonds crisis
In 1991, U.S. Treasury Deputy Assistant Secretary Mike Basham learned that Salomon trader Paul Mozer had been submitting false bids in an attempt to purchase more treasury bonds than permitted by one buyer during the period between December 1990 and May 1991.  Salomon was fined $190million for this infraction, and required to set aside $100million in a restitution fund for any injured parties. CEO Gutfreund left the company in August 1991 and a U.S. Securities and Exchange Commission (SEC) settlement resulted in a fine of $100,000 and Gutfreund being barred from serving as a chief executive of a brokerage firm. Warren Buffett briefly stepped into the CEO and chairman position. Buffett later promoted Deryck Maughan to take over as chairman and CEO. The scandal was then documented in the 1993 book Nightmare on Wall Street. The firm was acquired by Travelers Group in 1997.

The firm's top bond traders called themselves "Big Swinging Dicks," and were the inspiration for the book The Bonfire of the Vanities, by Tom Wolfe. The expression "Big Swinging Dick(s)" itself was used to refer to the Salomon bankers who dominated the game of extraordinary profit-making.

Some members of the Salomon Brothers' bond arbitrage, such as John Meriwether, Myron Scholes and Eric Rosenfeld later became involved with Long-Term Capital Management, a hedge fund that collapsed in 1998. The last years of Salomon Brothers, culminating in its involvement with Long-Term Capital Management, is chronicled in the 2007 book A Demon of Our Own Design.

Acquisition by Citigroup
Salomon (NYSE:SB) was acquired by Travelers Group in 1997; and, following the latter's merger with Citicorp in 1998, Salomon became part of Citigroup. The combined investment banking operations became known as Salomon Smith Barney. 7 World Trade Center, which had served as the headquarters for Salomon Brothers, continued to be used as the company's main office after the company was merged into Salomon Smith Barney.
 
Although the Salomon name carried on as Salomon Smith Barney, the investment banking operations of Citigroup, the division was renamed on 7 April 2003 to "Citigroup Global Markets Inc." As of 2020, Citigroup no longer owns the Salomon Brothers trademark, according to the records provided by the United States Patent and Trademark Office.

Revival 
In February 2022, it was announced that the Salomon Brothers brand will be revived by a group of former employees and execs. President R. Adam Smith said that the trademark had been acquired and they plan to operate as a full-service investment bank again.

Notable employees 
 Michael Lewis, American author and financial journalist, author of The Big Short, worked as a bond salesman in London for Salomon Brothers in the late 1980s.
 John Meriwether, American hedge fund manager, head of fixed-income trading and was promoted to vice-chairman in 1988.
 Michael Bloomberg, former mayor of New York City (2002-2013), head of equity trading and systems development in the 1970s.
 John Lipsky, acting managing director of the International Monetary Fund from May to July 2011, former director of European Economic and Market Analysis Group until 1992.
 Lewis Ranieri, "father" of mortgage-backed securities, headed the mortgage bonds desk at Salomon and reached the post of vice chairman.
 John Gutfreund, former chairman and CEO of Salomon Brothers who made the firm public.
 Myron Scholes, economist who invented the Black–Scholes model, recipient of the Nobel Memorial Prize in Economic Sciences in 1997, former managing director of fixed-income derivatives.
 Gedale B. Horowitz, founder and chairman of the Public Securities Association and Securities Industry Association, founding chairman of the Municipal Securities Rulemaking Board, member of the firm's executive committee.
 Michael Corbat, CEO of Citigroup from 2012 to 2021, began his career in the mortgage department in 1983.

References

Further reading

 

 Liar’s Poker: Rising Through the Wreckage on Wall Street by Michael Lewis. Penguin Books

Citigroup
Defunct financial services companies of the United States
American companies established in 1910
Financial services companies established in 1910
Banks established in 1910
Financial services companies disestablished in 1998
Banks disestablished in 1998
Former investment banks of the United States
Companies based in New York City